Jiangning is a town in Bobai County, Guangxi, China. , it administers Jiangning Street Community and the following eleven villages:
Jiangning Village
Muwang Village
Fangwu Village
Changjiang Village
Hehe Village
Daogen Village
Hebang Village
Dazhong Village
Lüjia Village
Silian Village
Taiping Village

References

Towns of Guangxi
Bobai County